Sébastien Berthet (born 28 January 1978 in Lyon, France) is a professional ice hockey player. He is currently on the roster of the Lyon Hockey Club (LHC), a team he joined in 1995.

Career 

Berthet joined the LHC in 1995 as part of the senior Division 1 squad. He spent four years playing with Lyon in France's Ligue Elite and remained with the team when they were relegated to Division 3 in 2000. He is the longest-serving member of the LHC team.

Berthet has represented France twice, first as a member of the 1995 Under-18 European Championship squad and later as a member of the 1997 Under-20 World Championship squad.

Playing style 
Berthet is a talented and physically strong player using his height (180 cm) and weight (90 kg) to his advantage on the ice. He is an attacker and plays left-handed.

In the 2007 regular season Berthet scored 6 goals and had 6 assists to rank 59th in the Eastern Pool. Berthet had an exceptional play-off series, scoring 5 times and with 9 assists to finish as the 7th most valuable player in the post-season.

External links 

1978 births
Sportspeople from Lyon
French ice hockey forwards
Living people